Xinglong, Sichuan is a town in the Garzê Tibetan Autonomous Prefecture of Sichuan, China.

References 

Populated places in the Garzê Tibetan Autonomous Prefecture
Towns in Sichuan